Heskin is a civil parish in the Borough of Chorley, Lancashire, England.  It contains 17 buildings that are recorded in the National Heritage List for England as designated listed buildings.   Of these, one is listed at Grade I, the highest of the three grades, one is at Grade II*, the middle grade, and the others are at Grade II, the lowest grade.  The parish is almost completely rural, and most of the listed buildings are, or originated as, farmhouses and farm buildings.  The other listed buildings are large houses and associated structures, and a cottage.

Key

Buildings

References

Citations

Sources

Lists of listed buildings in Lancashire
Buildings and structures in the Borough of Chorley